The W-League Golden Glove is an annual football (soccer) award presented to the top goalkeeper in the Australian W-League.

The W-League was established in 2008 as the top tier of women's football in Australia. The award is given to the top goalkeeper over the regular season (not including the finals series). The inaugural award was won by Melissa Barbieri of Melbourne Victory FC.

Lydia Williams has won the award five times. Mackenzie Arnold has won the award three times and Melissa Barbieri has won twice.

Winners

Awards won by club

See also

 List of sports awards honoring women
 W-League records and statistics
 Julie Dolan Medal

Notes

References

A-League Women trophies and awards
A-League Women lists
Women's association football trophies and awards